RDB (an acronym for Rhythm, Dhol, Bass) is a band initially formed in 1997 by three British Indian brothers, Kuldeep, Surjeet and Manjeet Singh Ral. The band's style blends western genres with traditional Punjabi beats and vocals. After the death of the eldest brother Kuldeep in 2012 and the departure of Manjeet to start a solo career, RDB has continued with the brother Surjeet.

History
RDB's musical journey began with singing at the gurdwara: "We used to assist our father in performing in front of the community at our local gurdwara, playing the harmonium and the tabla. This gave us a great understanding of our musical creativity and we mixed this with our passion for technology and started experimenting with sounds." In 2003, they won "Best Club DJ Bhangra" at the UK Asian Music Awards. In April 2011, Kuldeep was diagnosed with a brain tumour and underwent radiotherapy and chemotherapy. He died on 22 May 2012 in Houston, Texas.

While originally the remaining brothers planned to continue working together, A few months after Kuldeep's death, the band split and Surjeet and Manjeet went their separate ways. Surjeet continued to perform under the RDB banner, while Manjeet operated as an independent artist. In 2013 RDB was awarded Best Music Video for "We Doin’ It Big" at the Brit Asia TV Music Awards (BAMA). In BAMA 2014 RDB was awarded Best Music Video for "Daddy Da Cash" feat. T-Pain.

In 2014 Manjeet filed a lawsuit against Surjeet over the use of RDB songs and brand. An application for an interim injunction was rejected by the Bombay High Court.
According to Surjeet, the a lawsuit was withdrew in 2016. 
, Manjeet is operating independently.

Discography

Studio albums

Singles

Compilations and unofficial albums

Soundtracks

Collaborations

References

External links
RDB's Official Website

Bhangra (music) musical groups
Hindi cinema
Punjabi people
Musical groups established in 1997
English hip hop groups